Michael Ryan Miller (born September 27, 1989) is an American professional baseball infielder who is a free agent. He has played in one Major League Baseball (MLB) game, with the Boston Red Sox in 2016.

Early years
Miller attended De La Salle High School in Concord, California, Cuesta College in San Luis Obispo, California, and California Polytechnic State University (Cal Poly) in San Luis Obispo. He played college baseball for the Cuesta Cougars and Cal Poly Mustangs.

Professional career

Boston Red Sox
Miller was selected by the Boston Red Sox in the ninth round of the 2012 MLB draft. From 2012 through 2015, Miller played for several Red Sox farm teams: the Class A Short Season Lowell Spinners, the Class A Greenville Drive, the Class A-Advanced Salem Red Sox, the Double-A Portland Sea Dogs, and the Triple-A Pawtucket Red Sox.

Miller began the 2016 season with Double-A Portland, and was subsequently promoted to Triple-A Pawtucket. On June 27, Miller was added to Boston's major league roster. Miller made his MLB debut in that day's game against the Tampa Bay Rays, entering as a defensive replacement at second base in the eighth inning, and grounding out in an at bat in the ninth inning. On July 2, Miller was sent outright back to Pawtucket, removing him from the 40-man roster. Miller finished the season in Triple-A, appearing in 90 games while batting .228.

In 2017, Miller appeared in 85 games for Pawtucket, batting .261. He also made four appearances as a relief pitcher, registering a 12.71 ERA in  innings pitched. In 2018, he batted .284 with four home runs and 31 RBIs in 102 games with Pawtucket. He became a free agent after the 2018 season, then re-signed with the Red Sox organization in February 2019.

Miller began the 2019 season with Pawtucket, and was granted his release on August 3.

Minnesota Twins
On August 5, 2019, Miller signed a minor league deal with the Minnesota Twins and was assignment to the Triple-A Rochester Red Wings. He elected free agency on November 4, 2019.

References

External links

1989 births
Living people
People from Concord, California
Baseball players from California
Major League Baseball infielders
Boston Red Sox players
Cuesta Cougars baseball players
Cal Poly Mustangs baseball players
Lowell Spinners players
Greenville Drive players
Salem Red Sox players
Portland Sea Dogs players
Surprise Saguaros players
Pawtucket Red Sox players
Rochester Red Wings players
Peninsula Oilers players
De La Salle High School (Concord, California) alumni